Cantonal elections to elect half the membership of the general councils of France's 100 departments were held on 11 and 18 March 2001. While the left did poorly in the municipal elections held on the same dates, it emerged as the overall winner in the cantonal elections, gaining control of six departments and losing that of just one.

Electoral system
The cantonal elections use a two-round system similar to that employed in the country's legislative elections.
 Councillors are elected from single-member constituencies (the cantons).
 A candidate securing the votes of at least 25% of the canton's registered voters and more than 50% of the total number of votes actually cast in the first round of voting is thereby elected. If no candidate satisfies these conditions, then a second round of voting is held one week later.
 Entitled to present themselves in the second round are the two candidates who received the highest number of votes in the first round, plus any other candidate or candidates who received the votes of at least 10% of those registered to vote in the canton.
 In the second round, the candidate receiving the highest number of votes is elected.

Change in control

From right to left
 Corse-du-Sud (DVG)
 Creuse (PS)
 Eure (PS)
 Isère (PS)
 Haute-Saône(PS)
 Vaucluse (PS)

From left to right
 Allier (DVD)

Results

National results

General council presidents elected

By department

Sources

E-P

Ministry of the Interior results

2001
Cantonal elections
Cantonal elections